Zone 74 is a zone of the municipality of Al Khor in the state of Qatar. The main districts recorded in the 2015 population census were Simaisma, Al Jeryan, Al Khor City. 

Other districts which fall within its administrative boundaries are Al Egda, Al Heedan, Al Khor Industrial Area, Al Khor Island, Al Rashida, Ras Matbakh, Rawdat Bakheela, and Umm Anaig.

Demographics

Land use
The Ministry of Municipality and Environment (MME) breaks down land use in the zone as follows.

References 

Zones of Qatar
Al Khor